Harpyhaliaetus is a former genus of eagles. Recent studies have shown that the solitary eagle is closely related to the black-hawks, in particular the savanna hawk (Buteogallus meridionalis) which is smaller and browner but otherwise very similar to Harpyhaliaetus. Therefore, this genus is now merged into that of the black-hawks.

It contained the following species:

Buteoninae
Bird genera
Obsolete bird taxa